Rachna Sachdeva Korhonen is an American diplomat who has served as the United States ambassador to Mali since March 2023.

Early life and education 

Korhonen is from Flemington, New Jersey. She earned a Bachelor of Science degree in computer science and mathematics from Empire State College.

Career 

Korhonen began her career as a software programmer for IBM. From 1993 to 1999, she was a technical consultant at AT&T. She also worked in sales for the Zed Group, Telia Company, and Infosys. Korhonen joined the United States Foreign Service in 2004 and served in Dharan, Colombo, and Washington, D.C. Korhonen also served in the Bureau of South and Central Asian Affairs and Bureau of Near Eastern Affairs. She was also an advisor to the under secretary of state for management.

Nomination as U.S. ambassador to Mali 

On April 22, 2022, President Joe Biden announced his intent to nominate Korhonen to be the next United States ambassador to Mali. On April 25, 2022, her nomination was sent to the Senate. On August 3, 2022, hearings on her nomination were held before the Senate Foreign Relations Committee. On December 7, 2022, the committee favorably reported her nomination to the Senate. On December 13, 2022, her nomination was confirmed by the Senate by voice vote. She presented her credentials to President Assimi Goïta on March 16, 2023.

Personal life
Korhonen speaks Hindi, French, Finnish and Arabic.

References 

Living people
21st-century American diplomats
American women diplomats
Empire State College alumni
People from Flemington, New Jersey
United States Department of State officials
United States Foreign Service personnel
Year of birth missing (living people)